A Jain is a follower of Jainism, a religion of India.

Jain or JAIN may also refer to:
 Jain (singer) (born 1992), French singer-songwriter
 Jain (surname), a surname and list of notable people with the surname
 Jain, Iran, a village in Hormozgan Province, Iran
 Java APIs for Integrated Networks
 Jain Irrigation Systems
 Jain, a fictional race in Neal Asher's Polity series of science fiction novels

See also
 
 Chain (disambiguation)
 Gain (disambiguation)
 Jaina (disambiguation)
 Jaine
 Jane (disambiguation)
 List of Jains, a list of adherents of Jainism
 Sahu Jain, an industrial family of India